Agios Thomas is the Greek name for Saint Thomas and may refer to the following places::

In Greece:
Agios Thomas, Aetolia-Acarnania, a village in Aetolia-Acarnania
Agios Thomas, Boeotia, a village in Boeotia
Agios Thomas, Crete, a village in the Heraklion regional unit, Crete
Agios Thomas, Preveza, a village in the Preveza regional unit
Agios Thomas Diaporion, an uninhabited island belonging to the Saronic Islands
Agios Thomas, Cyprus